In enzymology, a butyrate-acetoacetate CoA-transferase is an enzyme that catalyzes the chemical reaction

butanoyl-CoA + acetoacetate  butanoate + acetoacetyl-CoA

Thus, the two substrates of this enzyme are butanoyl-CoA and acetoacetate, whereas its two products are butanoate and acetoacetyl-CoA.

This enzyme belongs to the family of transferases, specifically the CoA-transferases.  The systematic name of this enzyme class is butanoyl-CoA:acetoacetate CoA-transferase. Other names in common use include butyryl coenzyme A-acetoacetate coenzyme A-transferase, and butyryl-CoA-acetoacetate CoA-transferase.

References

 

EC 2.8.3
Enzymes of unknown structure